Kalleh Dairy is an Iranian dairy, food and drink company headquartered in Amol, Iran.

The company was founded by Solico Food Industries in 1991 as an industrial food company. In 2013 it had 26% of the Iranian cheese market. Besides Amol, it also has offices in Tehran, Iraq, United Arab Emirates, United States, Germany, Kuwait, Oman, Saudia, United Kingdom and Russia . Kalleh's products are sold under several names, including Pemina, Seven Yougurt, Jito, Brimond, Sorbonne, Delis, Anna, Pinka, Nari and SevenTen. Kalleh Dairy products are available throughout the country. Kalleh Amol Dairy products factory is one of the largest dairy products factories in the Middle East with receiving over 2,000 tons of milk per day. The Kalleh Group sells about 1,350 tons of products every day.

Products 
Kalleh products are highly variable products. 
So that now more than 160 types of dairy products are marketed.
Manufacture of kinds of Yogurt and Drink such as: Fresh Yogurt, Yogurt with cream, dripped Yogurt, diet Yogurt, Yoguret Useful for bones and Soft drink, Doogh
Manufacturer kinds of cheese such as: Firm cheese, semirigid cheese, diet cheese. 
Manufacturer kinds of ice-cream such as: Fruit ice-cream, diet ice-cream, liter & cup ice-cream. 
Manufacturer of milk such as: Milk with less oily & milk with more oily, milk with various tastes. 
 Cream: Pour & chocolate & dried whey kinds of dessert (chocolate, saffron, Nesscaffe)

Brand 
 Kalleh
 Lactivia
 Majan
 Amol
 Seven
 Bonny Chow
 Anna
 Nari
 Pinka
 Sorbon
 Celino
 Lucky Do
 Promilk

export to USA

Iran's first dairy product is Kalleh Company’s cheese, after being approved by the US Food and Drug Administration and the US Department of Agriculture, this product was officially exported to the United States for the first time. In addition to Los Angeles it was in stores of Washington, Chicago, New York, Boston and Houston.

References

External links 

 

Food and drink companies established in 1991
Iranian brands
Dairy products companies of Iran
Drink brands
Food and drink companies of Iran
Iranian companies established in 1991